Papiamenta is a genus of Caribbean cellar spiders that was first described by B. A. Huber in 2000.  it contains only two species, found only on Curaçao: P. levii and P. savonet.

See also
 List of Pholcidae species

References

Araneomorphae genera
Pholcidae
Spiders of the Caribbean